Smržov is a municipality and village in Hradec Králové District in the Hradec Králové Region of the Czech Republic. It has about 500 inhabitants.

Administrative parts
The village of Hubíles is an administrative part of Smržov.

References

Villages in Hradec Králové District